Sekolah Menengah Kebangsaan Bukit Jelutong ("SMKBJ" or "SMK Bukit Jelutong") is a government school located in Shah Alam, Selangor. In 2012, the school had 926 male students and 939 female students, for a total of 1865 students.

Academics
The school offers basic and advanced secondary courses. Students have core classes of maths, science, Malay, English, history, and Islamic education (for Muslim students) or moral education (for non-Muslim students).
Non-core classes such as geography, physical and Health education, visual arts, music, living skills, Chinese, and Tamil are also offered to the students.

Students in the higher secondary, however, are offered elective classes according to their chosen streams. Elective classes include additional mathematics, biology, chemistry, physics, accountancy, IT, and engineering drawing.

SMK Bukit Jelutong is one of 20 Eco-Schools in Malaysia. The school participates in various environmental works.

References

Eco-Schools
Secondary schools in Malaysia